South Uniontown is a census-designated place in South Union Township, Fayette County, Pennsylvania, United States. As of the 2010 census, the population was 1,360.

The community borders the southwestern side of the city of Uniontown, the Fayette County seat. U.S. routes 40 and 119, a four-lane bypass of the city and in this area part of the Mon–Fayette Expressway, form the western edge of the CDP.

Geography

References

External links

Census-designated places in Fayette County, Pennsylvania
Census-designated places in Pennsylvania